Ronald Grossarth-Maticek (19 June 1940) is a German sociologist specializing in the field of medical sociology, working in the fields of psychosomatics, psycho-oncology and health promotion. He is the director of the Institute for Preventive Medicine and professor for postgraduate studies (ECPD). In 2019, some of the works of Maticek and his co-author, psychologist Hans Eysenck, were reviewed by King's College London and 26 were declared "unsafe".

Biography 
Ronald Grossarth-Maticek was born in 1940 in Budapest. In 1973 he received his PhD at the University of Heidelberg, Germany, and in 1991 a doctorate in medical sciences (Dr. med. sc.) in the medical faculty of the University of Belgrade. From 1975 to 1982 he headed the research project "Social Scientific Oncology", supported by the German Research Foundation and the Foundation for Education and Handicapped Support in Stuttgart, among others. From 1982 to 1990, he was the head of the international research program "Prospective Epidemiology and Preventive Behavioral Medicine". In 1990 he became Director of the Institute for Preventive Medicine and Political, Economic and Health Psychology in Heidelberg, an institution of the European Centre for Peace and Development (ECPD) in Belgrade, which belongs to the University for Peace in Costa Rica associated with the United Nations. Grossarth-Maticek was awarded the title Professor by the European Center for Peace and Development (ECPD), which he may use in Germany with the addition Professor for Postgraduate Studies, ECPD.

Research 
Ronald Grossarth-Maticek is well known for his lectures, numerous books and articles in professional journals. From 1973 to 1995 he directed the Heidelberg Prospective Study, a long-term study in which around 30,000 people from 18,000 Heidelberg households were examined at regular intervals over a period of more than 20 years for a variety of health-influencing variables. On extensive questionnaires, he recorded dozens of physical factors (such as cigarette smoking, exercise, organ damage, genetic disposition and nutrition) as well as psychological factors (attachment to the mother in early childhood, stressors, distress, eustress, self-regulation). He developed his own behavioral typology, into which he classified the interviewees according to the degree of their self-regulation.

According to Grossarth-Maticek's research results, the risk of illness is multiplied by an insufficient self-regulation. Physical risk factors work mainly in sum, but especially when psychological risk factors are present at the same time. In the "Heidelberg Prospective Study" Grossarth was able to prove a predominantly multi-causal origin of chronic diseases. Grossarth-Maticek speaks of a "peculiar compulsion to act without necessity in a certain way and not differently". Such behavior arises from a consolidation of behavior patterns in the first years of life. If the "free flow of love" was disturbed by early childhood rejections, traumata, disappointment or other experiences, there could be disturbances of the inner and outer communication in adulthood, which, in combination with other factors synergistically, have an effect on health. Inspired by the cooperation with the psychologist Hans Jürgen Eysenck, Grossarth developed a new behavioural typology.

Grossarthian behavioral typology 
In the behavioral typology developed by Grossarth, six types of behavioral patterns are distinguished:

Type I: Suffering in isolation: central and persistent orientation towards a longed-for but withdrawing object; inhibition in the realization of the longed-for proximity, thus inhibiting the satisfaction of this emotionally most important need.

Type II: Helpless excitement: Central and persistent orientation towards a disturbing, obstructive object, without reaching the desired distancing, with recurring overexcitation and a feeling of helplessly being at the mercy of others.

Type III: Ambivalence: High ambivalence and strong egocentrism. Emotional instability with interim phases of autonomous self-regulation, but also with phases of intensive search for closeness with emotional needs on the one hand and after injuries phases of hyperactive excessive distancing on the other hand.

Type IV: Good self-regulation: Orientation towards current objects that enable subjective well-being, pleasure and security through which a sense of purpose can be experienced. Flexible self-regulation adapted to the situation and needs.

Type V: Emphasizes rational: Rational and antiemotional behavior. When overwhelmed by emotions, psychological crises and depressive mood arise.

Type VI: Irrational-emotional: Irrational, behaviour dominated by one's own feelings, without rational verification of one's own behaviour.

This typology is the result of Grossarth-Maticek's investigations into and considerations for the history and frequency of chronic diseases and health. He emphasizes similarities between types I and II and sees type III as a hybrid of I and II. Of course, in one subject, characteristics of several behavior types may be present at the same time, but one of them is usually dominant in behavior.

Autonomy training 
Grossarth-Maticek and his collaborators, as Helm Stierlin who wrote a preamble in Grossarth's book "Selbstregulation, Autonomie und Gesundheit", developed an autonomy training aimed at stimulating self-regulation. In this autonomy training, a special form of cognitive behavioral therapy, the ability to achieve well-being, pleasure, security, and fulfilment of meaning through self-active problem solving is strengthened in conversation. The trainee is encouraged to perceive himself/herself and to recognize which activities increase his/her well-being. Autonomy training is seen as a preventive intervention, which is suitable for achieving effective behavioural changes in a relatively short time and then incorporating them into a long-term preventive programme. .

Grossarth uses the term "autonomy" in the sense of an inner independence from objects with negative experienced consequences, which results from self-knowledge and redesign of communication. Self-regulation includes the personal ability to create the conditions for pleasure, well-being, security and inner balance through one's own behaviour in interpersonal relationships. However, the aim of this autonomy training is not egocentric Epicureanism, which ignores fellow human beings, but an attainment of happiness in a socially accepted framework, which respects and supports both the fellow human beings and one's own person. In 2001 Grossarth-Maticek had this protected under trademark law under the term Autonomietraining Gesundheit und Problemlösung durch Anregung der Selbstregulation.

The statistically average life-prolonging effect of autonomy training in cancer patients demonstrated in the Heidelberg prospective study cannot be interpreted in such a way that autonomy training is a method with which permanent healing can be achieved in any case, but the results show that the improvement of self-regulation is one of the factors that contribute to an improvement in the function of the immune system e.g. by changes in behaviour with regard to habits that are harmful to or promote health, stress reduction and increase in subjective well-being. His clinical study on mistletoe therapy in connection with improvement of self-regulation produced corresponding results. According to Grossarth-Maticek's findings, a high degree of self-regulation is also a significant factor for prevention. This was evident both in those people examined in this longitudinal study who already had good self-regulation and in those who learned it in the course of autonomy training. The database was verified by Werner W. Wittmann, who wrote the preface of Grossarth's book "Synergetic Preventive Medicine" (2008).

Based on Grossarth-Maticek's autonomy training and the effects on salutogenesis, Dierk Petzold, a physician and lecturer for general medicine at the Hannover Medical School, developed the concept of salutogenic communication.

Reception in Japan
Jun Nagano and his team from the Institute of Health Sciences at University Kyūshū carried out control studies on the correlation between the behavioral types distinguished by Grossarth and the frequency of certain diseases, as well as on the effectiveness of autonomy training. Although Grossarth does not speak of personality types, but of six types of changeable behavior, the Japanese authors lack a precise differentiation of the terms, so that on the one hand the term "behavior" is correctly used, but on the other hand the term "disease-prone personality", which Grossarth disproved, is wrongly used in the same context. As part of a collaboration between the Department of Psychosomatic Medicine of the University Kyūshū and the Ruprecht-Karls-Universität Heidelberg, Japanese physicians and other scientists, led by Jun Nagano, participated in two academic conferences at the Center for Multidisciplinary Research (Zentrum für multidisziplinäre Forschung ZMF) and founded the Japan Autonomy Training Association.Jun Nagano et al.: Rational/antiemotional behaviors in interpersonal relationships and the functional prognosis of patients with rheumatoid arthritis: a Japanese multicenter, longitudinal study. In: BioPsychoSocial Medicine 2014, doi:10.1186/1751-0759-8-8.Jun Nagano et al.: A Prospective Japanese Study of the Association between Personality and the Progression of Lung Cancer In: Internal Medicine 2006Jun Nagano et al.: Psychosocial Stress, Personality, and the Severity of Chronic Hepatitis C In: Original Research Reports 2004

 Public challenges 
In 2004, Lutz Edler claimed alleged deficiencies in a study on synergy effects of mistletoe therapy with other factors. In an article in the Deutsches Ärzteblatt there is a correction by Helmut Kiene (Witten/Herdecke University) in which Kiene maintains that all the points mentioned were based on incorrect assumptions and a lack of professional understanding.Dr. Helmut Kiene International Congress for Integrative Health and Medicine

Roderick D. Buchanan argued that Grossarth, who had "come a long way from ... war-torn Yugoslavia" was "living in a fine house overlooking the Heidelberg Castle in Germany on the steep embankments of the Neckar river" (in the neighbourhood of the Helm Stierlin-InstituteDeutsche Gesellschaft für Systemische Therapie: Helm Stierlin Institut e. V. Heidelberg) and that “a few thought him a visionary, but many distrusted him,” and that in 1977 when he presented his 100-page manuscript about the longitudinal research programme he had started in 1973 for the purpose of his habilitation to the University of Heidelberg Psychology Department "according to (Manfred) Amelang, the document was rejected largely, because the claims made were so extraordinary".Springer: Manfred Amelang

Beginning around 1984 Grossarth worked in collaboration with the London psychologist Hans Jürgen Eysenck. Eysenck played no role in the initiation of Grossarth's studies, nor had much influence over the process of most of the data-gathering. Eysenck would suggest analysis of the existing data and suggested that certain variables be explored more systematically. Their joint work was published during the years 1985-2000.

In an article published in 2019 in the journal Journal of Health Psychology Anthony J. Pelosi and David F. Mark's requested a review of some of Hans Jürgen Eysenck works with whom Grossarth-Maticek published for many years. Further details of which can be found in the Dr. Eysenck article.

Dr. Grossarth has presented some rebuttal points on a website.

 Actual Replication Studies 
A single potentially positive response to the withdrawn articles can be found in Whitfield et al. (2020): "Despite criticisms of the Grossarth-Maticek and Eysenck data, we found empirical support for some SIRI subtypes. In accord with the Grossarth-Maticek and Eysenck personality-stress model, and consistent with two previous SIRI studies, inverse associations of Type 4 (healthy) scores with all-cause mortality were found and also Type 2 scores predicted CVD mortality. However, no significant relationship was found between Type 1 scores and cancer mortality.

The results of a cross-sectional study conducted by the Medical Clinic 3 of the Ruhr University Bochum to investigate self-regulation and smoking as predictors of lung cancer confirm the correlations found by Grossarth et al. that risk factors, above all the psychosocial risk factor smoking, are significantly modulated by the factor self-regulation. 
In the Minnesota Multiphasic Personality Inventory cited therein, cancer patients showed a higher pre-morbid score in terms of repression and depression compared to non-cancer patients. The understanding of the influence of the psyche on the immune system and thus on the possible development of cancer is growing in conjunction with more recent results from psychoneuroimmunology.

 Selected works 
 
 
 Ronald Grossarth-Maticek, Hans Jürgen Eysenck, Greg J. Boyle: Method of test administration as a factor in test validity: the use of a personality questionnaire in the prediction of cancer and coronary heart disease''. In: Behaviour Research and Therapy, Volume 33, Issue 6, July 1995, page 705-710

References

1940 births
German sociologists
Medical sociologists
Heidelberg University alumni
German people of Hungarian descent
Living people